Acidic repeat containing protein is a protein that in humans is encoded by the ACRC gene.

References

External links